Radunović (Cyrillic script: Радуновић) is a surname derived from a masculine given name Radun. It may refer to:

Aleksandar Radunović (born 1980), football defender
Balša Radunović (born 1980), basketball player
Boris Radunović (born 1996), football goalkeeper
Nebojša Radunović (born 1954), gynecologist and professor
Risto Radunović (born 1992), footballer
Veselin Radunović (born 1974), football referee
Dejan Radunović (born 2002), football referee

Serbian surnames